This is the full medal table of the 1936 Winter Olympics, which were held in the villages of Garmisch and Partenkirchen in Bavaria, Germany.

Medal table

The medal table is based on information provided by the International Olympic Committee (IOC) and is consistent with IOC convention in its published medal tables. By default, the table is ordered by the number of gold medals the athletes from a nation have won (in this context, a nation is an entity represented by a National Olympic Committee). The number of silver medals is taken into consideration next and then the number of bronze medals. If nations are still tied, equal ranking is given and they are listed alphabetically.

External links
 
 
 

Medal table
1936